No. 1 Fighter Sector (1FS) was a Royal Australian Air Force (RAAF) unit formed at Bankstown, New South Wales on 25 February 1942.

The RAAF commandeered Capitol Theatre at Bankstown for use as an operations and plotting facility on 14 March 1942.

No. 1 Fighter Sector handed over operations to United States Army Air Corps (USAAC) on 10 April 1942. The operations shifted to a disused railway tunnel at St James railway station in Sydney.

On 13 August 1942, the RAAF resumed operations of No. 1 Fighter Sector and on 7 September 1942 the unit moved back to Bankstown. No. 1 Fighter Sector was renamed No. 101 Fighter Sector (101FS) on 18 October 1943 and was further renamed No. 101 Fighter Control Unit (101FCU) on 7 March 1944.

Unit became Air Defence Headquarters Sydney (ADHQ) on 21 January 1945 and moved into a three storey semi-underground purpose built operations and plotting facility at Bankstown.

ADHQ was disbanded on 27 January 1947.

Commanding officers
 Squadron Leader C.E. Woodman - 9 March 1942
 Squadron Leader G.K.K. Buscombe - 3 August 1942
 Squadron Leader H.A. Conaghan - 7 December 1942
 Wing Commander J.H. Wright - 10 May 1943
 Squadron Leader C.C. Loxton - 25 January 1944
 Squadron Leader A.H. Boyd - 21 April 1944
 Flight Lieutenant T.W. Livesey - 8 August 1944
 Flight Lieutenant J.G. Comans - 16 October 1944
 Wing Commander J.L. Darnton - 27 November 1944
 Wing Commander C.G.C. Olive - 5 January 1945
 Wing Commander S.W. Galton - 23 July 1945
 Wing Commander R. Kingsford-Smith DFC - 10 September 1945
 Flight Lieutenant G.B. Murtough DFC - 19 March 1946 
 Squadron Leader B.L. Bracegirdle - 11 June 1946

References

 

1
Military history of Sydney during World War II
City of Canterbury-Bankstown
Military units and formations established in 1942